Grants Hill is a mountain in Sullivan County, New York. It is located south-southeast of Livingston Manor. Chuck Hill is located southeast and Round Top is located north of Grants Hill.

References

Mountains of Sullivan County, New York
Mountains of New York (state)